Webster is an unincorporated community in Madison County, Iowa, in the United States.

History
Webster was laid out in 1855.

References

Unincorporated communities in Madison County, Iowa
Unincorporated communities in Iowa
1855 establishments in Iowa